Afghanistan Group of Newspapers is a group of print media in Afghanistan which includes The Daily Afghanistan and prominent English paper The Daily Outlook Afghanistan.

Websites
Afghanistan Group of Newspapers publishes its newspapers in English, Dari, and Pashto in Kabul and distributes its newspapers to most provinces of Afghanistan.
Afghanistan Group of Newspapers as well publishes its contents online.

External links
Official website of The Daily Outlook Afghanistan
Persian version of The daily Outlook Afghanistan

Mass media companies of Afghanistan
Mass media in Kabul
2004 establishments in Afghanistan